The Catalina 470 is an American sailboat, that was designed by Gerry Douglas and first built in 1998.

Production
The boat was built by Catalina Yachts in the United States, starting in 1998. The design is out of production.

Design
The Catalina 470 is a large recreational keelboat, built predominantly of fiberglass. It has a masthead sloop rig, an internally-mounted spade-type rudder and a fixed fin keel. It displaces  and carries  of ballast.

Variants
Catalina 470
Catalina 470 SD
Catalina 470 TR
Model with a tall rig about  higher and the mast moved aft.

See also
List of sailing boat types
Similar sailboats
Hunter 44

References

Keelboats
1990s sailboat type designs
Sailing yachts
Sailboat types built by Catalina Yachts
Sailboat type designs by Gerry Douglas